Alba Teruel Ribes (born 17 August 1996) is a Spanish professional racing cyclist, who currently rides for UCI Women's WorldTeam .

Major results

2013
 2nd Road race, National Junior Road Championships
2015
 8th Overall Vuelta a Burgos Feminas
2017
 1st  Overall Volta Ciclista Valencia Feminas
1st  Points classification
1st  Young rider classification
1st Stage 1
 9th Overall Vuelta a Burgos Feminas
 10th Madrid Challenge by La Vuelta
2018
 4th Grand Prix de Dottignies
2020
 10th Le Samyn des Dames

See also
 List of 2015 UCI Women's Teams and riders

References

External links
 

1996 births
Living people
Spanish female cyclists
People from Vall d'Albaida
Sportspeople from the Province of Valencia
Cyclists from the Valencian Community
21st-century Spanish women